Audacious is the debut studio album by American hip-hop artist CupcakKe, released on October 14, 2016. It was preceded by the release of two mixtapes, S.T.D (Shelters to Deltas) and Cum Cake. CupcakKe released it independently. The album was preceded by its leading single "Picking Cotton".

Background and promotion 
In September, The Fader published an interview with CupcakKe, which she discussed her new album that would address "rape and everything else".

On October 11, 2016, CupcakKe uploaded an image of her track list on Instagram. Days later, on October 14, 2016, Audacious was available on Spotify, Apple Music, and Google Play Music but not available on SoundCloud unlike its predecessor, S.T.D. (Shelters to Deltas).

The music video for "Picking Cotton" was released on October 13, 2016. "Spider-Man Dick" was released on November 9, 2016. "Budget" had a music video released on November 27, 2016. "LGBT" received a music video on December 11, 2016. "Ace Hardware" was released on January 9, 2017. The music video for "Homework" was released on January 19, 2017. "Mistress" was the final music video released on February 6, 2017.

Composition 
"LGBT" is an electro-infused LGBT anthem and a "rap anthem for queer acceptance". The album contains dirty rap songs such as "Spider-Man Dick." "Budget" is a hip hop track with trap and urban influences. "Picking Cotton" addresses racial injustice.

Artwork
The Fader describes the artwork as "provocative".

Singles 
"Picking Cotton" was released as the lead single on September 30, 2016.

Track listing 
Credits adapted from ASCAP and BMI.

Sampling credits
 "Homework Intro" samples the song "Piece of Me" by Britney Spears from her 2007 album Blackout.

References

External links
Official website

2016 debut albums
Cupcakke albums
Self-released albums